The Cave of the Seven Sleepers is a historical and religious site in al-Rajib, a village to the east of Amman. It is claimed that this cave housed the Seven Sleepers - a group of young men who, according to Byzantine and Islamic sources, fled the religious persecution of Roman emperor Decius. Legend has it that these men hid in a cave around 250 AD, emerging miraculously about 200 or 300 years later.  Considerable debate remains concerning the exact location of this cave - various locations in Turkey including Afşin, Tarsus, and Mount Pion been suggested in addition to the al-Rajib site. 
The site is surrounded by the remains of two mosques and a large Byzantine cemetery. It is near the Sabah bus station and approximately a fifteen-minute bus ride from Amman's Wihdat Station.

Religious Lore

Islamic

Some argue that the Cave of Seven Sleepers is the location referred to in Surah al-Kahf of the Qur'an. The surah is named after the Cave -  - in honor of the alleged piety of the seven sleepers.  The site's connection with Islamic heritage led to the participation of various Islamic leagues in its exploration and excavation. 
This cave was identified with Qur'anic record due to the name of nearby village al-Rajib, which is etymologically similar to the word al-Raqīm, mentioned in al-Kahf. Some also argue the site's correspondence with the Surat al-Kahf based on the finding of a dog's skull near the cave door.

Origins of the Cave's Name
The English name of this site refers to the seven sleepers who sought refuge in the cave, despite that accounts differ widely concerning the number of sleepers. The canonical Islamic text refers to seven sleeper and a dog. 
The site's Arabic name, is based on the triliteral root , denoting writing or calligraphy. It may refer to the village or mountain that the cave is located in. It also may refer to the book that recorded the names of the seven sleepers, as is suggested in Muhammad ibn Jarir al-Tabari's exegetical work Tafsir al-Tabari. The nearby village's modern name, al-Rajib, could be a corruption of the term al-Raqīm.

Discovery and Excavation
In 1951, Jordanian journalist Taysir Thabyan discovered the Cave of Seven Sleepers. He preceded to publish its photo on the journal of the Syrian Military Police and inform the Jordanian Department of Antiquities. The department assigned Jordanian archaeologist Rafiq al-Dajani the task of research and exploration in the cave. They found eight smaller sealed tombs inside the main cave, with the bones preserved inside.

Other Sites 
This is one of the seven sites, attributed to the Seven Sleepers legend;

 Tuyuq Khojam Mazar, Turpan, China
 Cave of the Seven Sleepers, Amman, Jordan
 Eshab-ı Kehf Cave, (de) Ephesus, Turkey
 Mosquée de Sept Dormants, Chenini, Tunisia
 Mar Musa, Syria
 Grotto of the Seven Sleepers, İzmir, Turkey
 Eshab-ı Kehf Cave, Kahramanmaraş, Turkey

References 

Historic sites
Islamic architecture